Image Creative Education is an animation training institute in India, established in 1996 . It offers professional, job-oriented courses in Animation, Visual Effects, Graphic Design, Web Design and few other Digital design related streams. In the 20 years, it has established 40 training institutes across India and has trained around 60,000 students.

In 2005, Image Creative Education became an ISO 9001:2008 certified company.

Courses Offered

Certificate Courses 
 2D Animation Design
 3D Design
 Digital Video Production
 Graphic and Web Design
 Graphic Design
 Graphics and 2D Animation
 Graphics and 3D Animation
 Interior Design
 Visual Effects
 Web and UI Design
 AR VR Techonogies

Higher Diploma Courses 
 3D Animation
 3D and Visual Effects
 Advertising Design
 Fashion Design
 Game Technologies
 Interior Design
 Web Technologies
 AR VR Technologies

UG Course 
 B.Sc. Multimedia

Partner of NSDC 
Image Creative Education is a Training Partner of National Skill Development Corporation (NSDC), a Public-Private Partnership system that falls under the Ministry of Skill Development and Entrepreneurship. NSDC visions to provide/improve the skills of 400 million people in India by 2022. With this partnership, Image Creative Education has proposed to train more than 1 Lakh students in 10 years.

Collaboration 
The UG Degree course, B.Sc. Multimedia at Image Creative Education is offered in strategic technical collaboration with Annamalai University. The collaboration was established in 2009.

Creative Education for Needy 
Along with for-profit training services, Image Creative Education also makes creative education available for the needy by joining hands with Vivekananda Cultural Centre (VCC). Through this collaboration, the economically-less privileged students are offered Certificate course in Graphic Design at subsidized fees.

Associated Establishments 
 ICAT Design & Media College
 Image Infotainment PVT LTD
 ImageMinds

References

External links 
Official Website of Image Creative Education: http://www.image.edu.in/

Animation schools in India
Companies based in Chennai
Universities and colleges in Chennai
Educational institutions established in 1996
1996 establishments in Tamil Nadu